is a Japanese footballer currently playing as a midfielder for Vanraure Hachinohe.

Career statistics

Club
.

Notes

References

1998 births
Living people
Association football people from Tokyo
Sapporo University alumni
Japanese footballers
Association football midfielders
J3 League players
Vanraure Hachinohe players